Cyprus will be represented by 10 athletes at the 2010 European Athletics Championships held in Barcelona, Spain.

Participants

Men

Track and field events

Field events

Women

Track and road events

Field events

Results

References 
Participants list (men)
Participants list (women)

Nations at the 2010 European Athletics Championships
2010
European Athletics Championships